Carpenters Bayou rises at the south end of Sheldon Reservoir in southeastern Harris County, Texas, USA. The bayou waterway routes southeast for about twelve miles until it joins Buffalo Bayou at the San Jacinto Battleground State Historic Site.

History
The bayou's name commemorates David Carpenter, a partner of William Harris as one of Stephen F. Austin's "Old Three Hundred" families of Austin's Colony in what later became Texas.  Carpenter and Harris received a sitio of land in present Harris County, Texas on August 16, 1824, which fronted on Carpenter's Bayou in southeastern Harris County, near San Felipe de Austin.  Carpenter was a blacksmith, and a single man at the time of the grant.  He may have died as early as 1828, the year that Noah Smithwick bought his blacksmith's outfit in San Felipe.

See also
List of rivers of Texas

References

External links
 

Rivers of Harris County, Texas
Rivers of Texas